Sarah Vaughan Sings Broadway: Great Songs from Hit Shows is a 1958 studio album by Sarah Vaughan.

The album was arranged by Hal Mooney, supervised by Bob Shad.

Track listing and original shows 
Disc One
 "A Tree in the Park" (Richard Rodgers, Lorenz Hart)  - 2:43 - Peggy-Ann (1926)
 "Little Girl Blue" (Rodgers, Hart) - 3:51 - Jumbo (1935)
 "Comes Love" (Lew Brown, Charles Tobias, Sam H. Stept) - 2:34 - Yokel Boy (1939)
 "But Not for Me" (George Gershwin, Ira Gershwin) - 3:27 - Girl Crazy (1930)
 "My Darling, My Darling" (Frank Loesser) - 3:21 - Where's Charley? (1948)
 "Lucky in Love" (Ray Henderson, B.G. DeSylva, Brown) - 1:55 - Good News (1937)
 "Autumn in New York" (Vernon Duke) - 3:20 - Thumbs Up (1934)
 "It Never Entered My Mind" (Rodgers, Hart) - 3:42 - Higher and Higher (1940)
 "If This Isn't Love" (Burton Lane, Yip Harburg) - 2:11 - Finian's Rainbow (1947)
 "The Touch of Your Hand" (Jerome Kern, Otto Harbach) - 2:16 - Roberta (1933)
 "Homework" (Irving Berlin) - 3:15 - Miss Liberty (1949)
 "Bewitched, Bothered and Bewildered" (Rodgers, Hart) - 3:31 - Pal Joey (1940)
 "Dancing In the Dark" (Arthur Schwartz, Howard Dietz) - 2:37 - The Band Wagon (1931)
 "September Song" (Kurt Weill, Maxwell Anderson) - 3:04 - Knickerbocker Holiday (1938)
 "A Ship Without a Sail" (Rodgers, Hart) - 3:25 - Heads Up! (1933)
 "Lost in the Stars" (Weill, Anderson) - 3:39 - Lost in the Stars (1949)
 "It's Got to Be Love" (Rodgers, Hart) - 2:28 - On Your Toes (1936)
 "All the Things You Are" (Kern, Oscar Hammerstein II) - 3:09 - Very Warm for May (1939)
Disc Two
 "Poor Butterfly" (John Golden, John Raymond Hubbell) - 3:32 - The Big Show (1916)
 "Let's Take an Old-Fashioned Walk" (Irving Berlin) - 2:25 - Miss Liberty (1949)
 "My Heart Stood Still" (Rodgers, Hart) - 3:03 - A Connecticut Yankee (1927)
 "He's Only Wonderful" (Sammy Fain, Harburg)  - 3:21 - Flahooley (1951)
 "They Say It's Wonderful" (Berlin) - 3:01 - Annie Get Your Gun (1947)
 "My Ship" (I. Gershwin, Weill)  - 2:55 - Lady in the Dark (1941)
 "You're My Everything" (Mort Dixon, Harry Warren, Joe Young) - 2:53 - The Laugh Parade (1931)
 "Can't We Be Friends?" (Paul James, Kay Swift) - 3:26 - The Little Show (1929)
 "Love Is a Random Thing" (Fain, George Marion, Jr.) - 2:52 - Toplitzky of Notre Dame (1946)
 "If I Loved You" (Hammerstein, Rodgers) - 3:28 - Carousel (1946)
 "It's De-Lovely" (Cole Porter) - 2:46 - Red, Hot and Blue (1936)
 "It's Love" (Leonard Bernstein, Betty Comden, Adolph Green) - 2:05 - Wonderful Town (1953)
 "And This Is My Beloved" (George Forrest, Robert C. Wright) - 3:03 - Kismet (1953)
 "Mr. Wonderful" (Jerry Bock, Larry Holofcener, George David Weiss) - 2:48 - Mr. Wonderful (1955)
 "Don't Look at Me That Way" (Porter) - 2:16 - Paris (1928)
 "I Loved Him (But He Didn't Love Me)" (Porter) - 3:21 - Wake Up and Dream (1929)

References

1958 albums
Sarah Vaughan albums
Albums arranged by Hal Mooney
Mercury Records albums